The Senegal chameleon (Chamaeleo senegalensis) is a species of chameleon native to West Africa.  Its range includes Senegal, Mali, Nigeria, and Cameroon, and it lives in moist savanna. Due to its wide range and unknown population, the Senegal chameleon is listed as Least Concern by the IUCN Red List. However, it may be threatened by the pet trade. The Senegal chameleon is usually olive brown, and ranges from 20 to 30 cm in length, although the male is usually smaller.

Gallery

References

Chamaeleo
Reptiles described in 1802
Taxa named by François Marie Daudin